The Roanoke City Health Center is a historic health care facility at 515 8th Street SW in Roanoke, Virginia.  It is a modest single-story brick building in a U-shaped plan.  It was built in 1951, and exemplifies trends of the period in the provision of health care to rural communities.  It also exhibits features distinctive to the Jim Crow era of segregated facilities, as it was originally designed with separate areas for whites and African Americans.

The building, now vacant, was listed on the National Register of Historic Places in 2016.

See also
National Register of Historic Places listings in Roanoke, Virginia

References

Hospital buildings completed in 1951
African-American history of Virginia
Hospital buildings on the National Register of Historic Places in Virginia
Buildings and structures in Roanoke, Virginia
National Register of Historic Places in Roanoke, Virginia